The 2014 European Parliament election in Portugal elected the Portuguese delegation to the European Parliament from 2014 to 2019. This was the seventh European Parliament election held in Portugal. The elections were held on Sunday, 25 May 2014.

The Socialist Party (PS) was the winner of the elections, scoring 31.5% of the votes. The Socialists increased their share of vote by almost 5%, and won one more seat compared with 2009. However, the PS victory was much more weaker than what polls predicted, as the margin between them and the Social Democratic Party (PSD) and CDS – People's Party (CDS) coalition was below 4%. Because of this worse than expected result, the PS would enter in a leadership contest just weeks after the election.

The PSD/CDS contested the election in a coalition called "Portugal Alliance". The coalition achieved one of the worst results ever, as PSD+CDS never polled below 30%, but the weak result by the coalition was softened by the close margin between them and the Socialists.

The Democratic Unity Coalition (CDU) scored their best result since 1989, polling almost 13% of the vote and winning one more seat compared with 2009. On the other hand, the Left Bloc (BE) suffered a huge defeat by erasing their 2009 historic results. The BE won 4.6% of the votes, a drop of more than 6%, and was only able to elect their top candidate Marisa Matias, compared with the three seats they won in 2009.

The big surprise of the elections was the extraordinary result of the Earth Party (MPT). Headed by the former bar association chairman António Marinho e Pinto, MPT won 7.2% of the votes and was able to elect two members to the European Parliament. To add also, that LIVRE, headed by BE dissident Rui Tavares, was not able to win a seat, although scoring 2.2%.

Turnout fell to the lowest level ever, with only 33.7% of voters casting a ballot.

Electoral system
The voting method used, for the election of European members of parliament, is by proportional representation using the d'Hondt method, which is known to benefit leading parties. In the 2014 European Union elections, Portugal had 21 seats to be filled. Deputies are elected in a single constituency, corresponding to the entire national territory.

Parties and candidates 
The major parties that participated in the election, and their European Parliament list leaders, were:

Left Bloc (BE), Marisa Matias
Democratic Unity Coalition (CDU), João Ferreira
Socialist Party (PS), Francisco Assis
Social Democratic Party (PSD)/People's Party (CDS–PP) Aliança Portugal, Paulo Rangel
LIVRE (L), Rui Tavares
Socialist Alternative Movement (MAS), Gil Garcia
Earth Party (MPT), António Marinho e Pinto
Party for Animals and Nature (PAN), Orlando Figueiredo
Portuguese Workers' Communist Party (PCTP/MRPP), Leopoldo Mesquita
Democratic Party of the Atlantic (PDA), Paulo Casaca
New Democracy Party (PND), Eduardo Welsh
National Renovator Party (PNR), Humberto Nuno de Oliveira
Workers Party of Socialist Unity (POUS), Carmelinda Pereira
People's Monarchist Party (PPM), Nuno Correia da Silva
Portugal Pro-Life (PPV), Acácio Valente
Portuguese Labour Party (PTP), José Manuel Coelho

The Social Democratic Party and the People's Party have contested this election in a coalition.

Opinion polling

Graphical summary

Polling

National summary of votes and seats

|-
!style="background-color:#E9E9E9" align=left colspan=2|National party
!style="background-color:#E9E9E9" align=left|Europeanparty
!style="background-color:#E9E9E9" align=left|Main candidate
!style="background-color:#E9E9E9" align=right|Votes
!style="background-color:#E9E9E9" align=right|%
!style="background-color:#E9E9E9" align=right|+/–
!style="background-color:#E9E9E9" align=right|Seats
!style="background-color:#E9E9E9" align=right|+/–
|- align="right"
| style="background-color: " width=5px|
| align="left"| Socialist Party (PS)
| align="left"| PES
| align="left"| Francisco Assis
| 1,034,249
| 31.49
| 4.96 
! 8
| 1 
|- align="right"
| style="background-color: #00aaaa" width=5px|
| align="left" valign="top" | Portugal Alliance (AP) • Social Democratic Party (PSD)• People's Party (CDS–PP)
| align="left" valign="top" | EPP
| align="left"  valign="top" | Paulo Rangel
| valign="top" | 910,647
| valign="top" | 27.73
| valign="top" |
! 76<small>1
| 2 1 
|- align="right"
| style="background-color: " width=5px|
| align="left" valign="top" | Unitary Democratic Coalition (CDU) • Communist Party (PCP)• Ecologist Party (PEV)
| align="left" valign="top" | EGP / PEL
| align="left"  valign="top" | João Ferreira
| valign="top" | 416,925
| valign="top" | 12.69
| valign="top" | 2.05 
!330
| 1 0 
|- align="right"
| style="background-color: " width=5px|
| align="left"| Earth Party (MPT)
| align="left"| ALDE
| align="left"| Marinho e Pinto
| 234,788
| 7.15
| 6.48 
! 2
| 2 
|- align="right"
| style="background-color: " width=5px|
| align="left"| Left Bloc (B.E.)
| align="left"| PEL / EACL
| align="left"| Marisa Matias
| 149,764
| 4.56
| 6.16 
! 1
| 2 
|- 
| style="background-color: " width=5px|
| align="left"| LIVRE (L)
| align="left"| 
| align="left"| Rui Tavares
| 71,495
| 2.18
| new
! 0
| new
|- align="right"
| style="background-color: teal" width=5px|
| align="left"| Party for Animals and Nature (PAN)
| align="left"| EUL-NGL
| align="left"| Orlando Figueiredo
| 56,431
| 1.72
| new
! 0
| new
|- align="right"
| style="background-color: " width=5px|
| align="left"| Workers' Communist Party (PCTP/MRPP)
| align="left"| None
| align="left"| Leopoldo Mesquita
| 54,708 
| 1.67
| 0.47 
! 0
| 0 
|- align="right"
| style="background-color: " width=5px|
| align="left"| New Democracy Party (PND)
| align="left"| EUD
| align="left"| Eduardo Welsh
| 23,082
| 0.70
| new
! 0
| new
|- align="right"
| style="background:#CC0033;" width=5px|
| align="left"| Portuguese Labour Party (PTP)
| align="left"| None
| align="left"| José Manuel Coelho
| 22,542
| 0.69
| new
! 0
| new
|- align="right"
| style="background-color: " width=5px|
| align="left"| People's Monarchist Party (PPM)
| align="left"| None
| align="left"| Nuno Correia da Silva
| 17,785
| 0.54
| 0.14 
! 0
| 0 
|- align="right"
| style="background-color: " width=5px|
| align="left"| National Renovator Party (P.N.R.)
| align="left"| None
| align="left"| Humberto Oliveira
| 14,887
| 0.45
| 0.08 
! 0
| 0 
|- align="right"
| style="background:crimson;" width=5px|
| align="left"| Socialist Alternative Movement (MAS)
| align="left"| None
| align="left"| Gil Garcia
| 12,497
| 0.38
| new
! 0
| new
|- align="right"
| style="background:#000080;" width=5px|
| align="left"| Portugal Pro-Life (PPV)
| align="left"| None
| align="left"| Acácio Valente
| 12,008
| 0.37
| new
! 0
| new
|- align="right"
| style="background-color: " width=5px|
| align="left"| Democratic Party of the Atlantic (PDA)
| align="left"| None
| align="left"| Paulo Casaca
| 5,298
| 0.16
| new
! 0
| new
|- align="right"
| style="background-color:  " width=5px|
| align="left"| Workers Party of Socialist Unity (POUS)
| align="left"| None
| align="left"| Carmelinda Pereira
| 3,666
| 0.11
| 0.04 
! 0
| 0 
|- style="background-color:#E9E9E9"
| style="text-align:right;" colspan="4" | Valid votes
| 3,040,771
| 92.58
| colspan="3" rowspan="2" | 
|- style="background-color:#E9E9E9"
| style="text-align:right;" colspan="4" | Blank and invalid votes
| 243,681
| 7.42
|- style="background-color:#E9E9E9"
| style="text-align:right;" colspan="4" | Totals
| 3,284,452
| 100.00
| —
! style="background-color:#E9E9E9"| 21
| 1 
|- style="background-color:#E9E9E9"
| colspan="4" | Electorate (eligible voters) and voter turnout
| 9,753,568
| 33.67
| 3.11 
| colspan="2"| 
|-
| align="left" colspan="11"| Source: Comissão Nacional de Eleições 
|}

Distribution by European group

Maps

See also 

2014 European Parliament election
Politics of Portugal
List of political parties in Portugal

References

External links 
 Official results site, Portuguese Justice Ministry
 Portuguese Electoral Commission
 ERC – Official publication of polls

Portugal
European Parliament elections in Portugal
2014 elections in Portugal